Michael Booth is an English food and travel writer and journalist who writes regularly for a variety of newspapers and magazines including the Independent on Sunday, Condé Nast Traveller, Monocle and Time Out, among many other publications at home and abroad.

Career
In June 2010, Michael Booth won the Guild of Food Writers Kate Whiteman Award for Work on Food and Travel. His book on Japanese cooking, Sushi and Beyond: What the Japanese Know About Cooking, was adapted into a Japanese anime television series which began airing in April 2015.

Personal life
He has a wife, Lissen, and two children, Asger and Emil. They live in Denmark.

Bibliography
Just As Well I'm Leaving: To the Orient with Hans Christian Andersen (2005)
Sacré Cordon Bleu: What the French Know About Cooking (2008)
Doing without Delia: Tales of Triumph and Disaster in a French Kitchen (2009)
 (2009)
Super Sushi Ramen Express: One Family's Journey Through the Belly of Japan  (retitled US reprint) 2016
Eat, Pray, Eat: One Man's Accidental Search for Equanimity, Equilibrium and Enlightenment (2011)
The Almost Nearly Perfect People: The Truth About the Nordic Miracle (2014)
Eating Dangerously: Why the Government Can't Keep Your Food Safe ... and How You Can (2014), with Jennifer Brown
The Meaning of Rice: a culinary tour of Japan (2017)
Three Tigers, One Mountain: A Journey Through the Bitter History and Current Conflicts of China, Korea, and Japan (2020)

References

External links
 Michael Booth website

English food writers
English travel writers
Living people
Alumni of Le Cordon Bleu
Year of birth missing (living people)